The Vitas Gerulaitis Cup will be a professional tennis tournament held in Vilnius, Lithuania since 2023. The tournament will be held on indoor hard courts of the SEB Arena.

Background
Vitas Gerulaitis was a well known Lithuanian American tennis player and a former #3 ATP who achieved a status of an icon in Lithuania, having famously won the 1977 Australian Open title. With the approval of his family's estate, the organizers chose to name the event after him.

This is not the first tennis event in Vilnius named after Gerulatis as previously ITF tour events organized in Vilnius also had carried the name of the "Vitas Gerulaitis Memorial Cup". Furthermore, the hosting arena had previously been known under the working title "Vitas Gerulaitis Memorial Tennis Centre" and 2004 was declared as the Vitas Gerulaitis' year by the Lithuanian Tennis Association.

Past finals

Singles

Doubles

See Also
Vilnius Open

References

External links
 SEB Arena

ATP Challenger Tour
Tennis tournaments in Lithuania
Tennis in Lithuania
Sports competitions in Vilnius
Recurring sporting events established in 2023
Hard court tennis tournaments
Winter events in Lithuania